Psammosteidae  is an extinct family of flattened, benthic heterostracan vertebrates that lived in marine and estuary environments in Europe, Russia & North America. They arose during the Early Devonian, with the first (and best) known genus, Drepanaspis from the Hunsrück lagerstätte.  The Psammosteids were the only heterostracans that survived the Upper Frasnian extinction event during the Late Devonian, dying out in the extinction event at the very end of the Devonian. 

Many of the Late Devonian genera, such as Psammolepis, were among the largest heterostracans ever, growing to be at least 1.5 metres in width.

References
Palaeos Vertebrates

Devonian jawless fish
Prehistoric jawless fish families
Heterostraci
Famennian extinctions
Early Devonian first appearances